Filip Malbašić (born 18 November 1992) is a Serbian professional footballer who plays as a winger or forward for Serbian SuperLiga club Vojvodina.

Club career
Malbašić started out at Radnički Beograd. He was promoted to the senior squad during the 2008–09 Serbian League Belgrade, as the club suffered relegation at the end of the season. In the summer of 2010, Malbašić moved to Rad, making his Serbian SuperLiga debut later that year, four days shy of his 18th birthday. He scored his first goal for Rad in a 1–4 home league loss to Partizan in March 2012.

In July 2012, Malbašić was transferred to German side 1899 Hoffenheim. He was unable to make any appearance in his debut season at the club. After failing to earn his place in the squad, Malbašić completed a season-long loan move to Partizan in June 2013. He was subsequently loaned to the Polish club Lechia Gdańsk in August 2014.

Six months before the expiration of his contract with 1899 Hoffenheim, Malbašić was transferred to Vojvodina, penning a two-and-a-half-year deal on 21 January 2016. He scored once in the league from 14 appearances until the end of the 2015–16 campaign. In the next 2016–17 season, Malbašić was the league's third-highest scorer with 16 goals, being selected in the competition's best eleven.

On 22 August 2017, Malbašić was transferred to Spanish club Tenerife on a four-year contract. On 30 January 2020, he was loaned to fellow Segunda División side Cádiz for six months, signing permanently until 2023 with the latter side on 22 July, after achieving promotion.

On 31 August 2021, Malbašić rescinded his contract with the Andalusians. The following 21 January, he moved to Burgos in the second division.

International career
Malbašić represented Serbia at the 2011 UEFA European Under-19 Championship. He later played for the Serbia U21 side, between 2012 and 2014, scoring two goals.

Statistics

Honours
 Serbian SuperLiga Team of the Season: 2016–17

Notes

References

External links
 
 
 
 

 

Association football midfielders
Association football forwards
Cádiz CF players
CD Tenerife players
Ekstraklasa players
Expatriate footballers in Germany
Expatriate footballers in Poland
Expatriate footballers in Spain
FK Partizan players
FK Rad players
FK Radnički Beograd players
FK Vojvodina players
Footballers from Belgrade
La Liga players
Lechia Gdańsk players
Segunda División players
Serbia under-21 international footballers
Serbia youth international footballers
Serbian expatriate footballers
Serbian expatriate sportspeople in Germany
Serbian expatriate sportspeople in Poland
Serbian expatriate sportspeople in Spain
Serbian footballers
Serbian SuperLiga players
TSG 1899 Hoffenheim players
1992 births
Living people
Burgos CF footballers